Jaume Serra i Cau (died 1517) was a Spanish Valencian cardinal, from the city of Valencia. He was tutor to the young Giovanni Borgia, and a close associate of his father Pope Alexander VI.

He was archbishop of Oristano in 1492, and was created cardinal in 1500. He was bishop of Linköping in 1501, bishop of Elne in 1506. He was bishop of Albano in 1511, and possibly bishop of Palestrina in 1516 (sources disagree).

He was governor of Rome and Cesena

He was buried in  San Giacomo degli Spagnoli, where a mortuary chapel was built for him.

Notes

External links

1517 deaths
16th-century Spanish cardinals
Cardinals created by Pope Alexander VI
Cardinal-bishops of Albano
Bishops of Elna
Year of birth unknown